This is a list of software for amateur radio.

Software tools

Logging Software

Operating systems 
The Debian project maintains a pure blend that includes ham radio software. The HamBSD project is a variation of OpenBSD.

See also 
 Amateur radio station § Computer-control software
 List of amateur radio modes
 Software-defined radio

References

External links 
 DXZone Amateur Radio Software - An exhaustive directory of amateur radio software

Software
Amateur radio-related lists
Lists of software